UFC on Fox: dos Anjos vs. Cowboy 2 (also known as UFC on Fox 17) was a mixed martial arts event held on December 19, 2015, at the Amway Center in Orlando, Florida.

Background
The event was headlined by a UFC Lightweight Championship bout between current champion Rafael dos Anjos and top contender Donald Cerrone. Dos Anjos won their first fight at UFC Fight Night: Condit vs. Kampmann 2 by unanimous decision.

Germaine de Randamie was scheduled to face Sarah Kaufman at the event. However, De Randamie pulled out of the fight on December 3 citing an injury. On December 11, she was replaced by promotional newcomer Valentina Shevchenko.

Charles Oliveira missed weight on his first attempt at the weigh ins, coming in at 150.5 lb. He was given additional time to make the weight limit, but made no attempts to cut further. Instead, he was fined 20 percent of his fight purse, which went to Myles Jury. This marked the third time that Oliveira missed weight in his UFC career.

By reporters and UFC fans alike, UFC on Fox 17 is regarded as one of the greatest cards that the UFC has ever offered on broadcast television. Future UFC stars such as  Nate Diaz and Vicente Luque, and future champions Valentina Shevchenko, Charles Oliveira,  and Francis Ngannou  were all victorious on this card. Additionally, Kamaru Usman defeated Leon Edwards by unanimous decision; the two met in a rematch for the UFC Welterweight Championship on August 20, 2022, headlining UFC 278. Edwards won by knockout in the fifth round.

Results

Bonus awards
The following fighters were awarded $50,000 bonuses:
Fight of the Night: Nate Diaz vs. Michael Johnson
Performance of the Night: Rafael dos Anjos and Vicente Luque

Reported payout
The following is the reported payout to the fighters as reported to the Florida State Boxing Commission. It does not include sponsor money and also does not include the UFC's traditional "fight night" bonuses.

 Rafael dos Anjos: $300,000 (no win bonus) def. Donald Cerrone: $79,000
 Alistair Overeem: $542,857 (includes $200,000 win bonus) def. Junior dos Santos: $400,000
 Nate Diaz: $40,000 (includes $20,000 win bonus) def. Michael Johnson: $30,000
 Karolina Kowalkiewicz: $26,000 (includes $13,000 win bonus) def. Randa Markos: $12,000
 Charles Oliveira: $66,600 (includes $37,000 win bonus) def. Myles Jury: $30,000 ^
 Nate Marquardt: $98,000 (includes $49,000 win bonus) def. C.B. Dollaway: $40,000
 Valentina Shevchenko: $24,000 (includes $12,000 win bonus) def. Sarah Kaufman: $22,000
 Tamdan McCrory: $24,000 (includes $12,000 win bonus) def. Josh Samman: $10,000
 Nik Lentz: $70,000 (includes $35,000 win bonus) def. Danny Castillo: $39,000
 Cole Miller: $30,000 vs. Jim Alers: $10,000 <
 Kamaru Usman: $24,000 (includes $12,000 win bonus) def. Leon Edwards: $15,000
 Vicente Luque: $20,000 (includes $10,000 win bonus) def. Hayder Hassan: $10,000
 Francis Ngannou: $20,000 (includes $8,000 win bonus) def. Luis Henrique: $10,000

^ Oliviera was fined $7,400, 20 percent of his purse for failing to make the required weight for his fight with Myles Jury.
< Both fighters earned show money; bout declared No Contest.

See also
List of UFC events
2015 in UFC

References

Fox UFC
Events in Orlando, Florida
Mixed martial arts in Florida
Sports competitions in Orlando, Florida
2015 in mixed martial arts
December 2015 sports events in the United States